Henrik Holm  (born 6 September 1990) is a Norwegian ice hockey player who is currently playing for Stavanger Oilers of the GET-ligaen.

Holm was selected to compete at the 2018 Winter Olympics as a member of the Norway men's national ice hockey team.

References

External links

1990 births
Living people
Ice hockey players at the 2018 Winter Olympics
Stavanger Oilers players
Norwegian ice hockey players
Norwegian ice hockey goaltenders
Olympic ice hockey players of Norway
Sportspeople from Fredrikstad
Stjernen Hockey players